The Frank F. Cranz House is a historic house in Nogales, Arizona. It was built in 1901–1907 for Franklin F. Cranz, who served as the mayor of Nogales from 1904 to 1906. It was designed in the Queen Anne architectural style. It has been listed on the National Register of Historic Places since August 29, 1985.

References

National Register of Historic Places in Santa Cruz County, Arizona
Queen Anne architecture in Arizona
Houses completed in 1907